Julian Paolo Uccello (born October 30, 1986) is a Canadian soccer player.

Career

Youth
From the age of 5 to 15, Julian had played with youth clubs in Ontario, including Richmond Hill Soccer Club, Thornhill Soccer Club, Kleinburg Nobleton Soccer Club and Woodbridge Soccer Club, before moving overseas. Julian secured a trial with Manchester United for six months, playing a league game with the U-17 team, scoring a goal in his only game for the club. Julian then went on to trial with the Bolton Wanderers of the Premier League a year later. Following these trials in England, Uccello found a home to continue his footballing development in Italy, first being brought over by Lazio, but in the end signing on with A.C. Milan.

Professional
After  Milan's youth team, Julian was put on loan with Savona of Serie D in 2004, scoring 19 goals in his first year one shy of all time record held by Panucci. At the end of his loan deal with Savona, he was released by Milan, at which point he signed with AC Sansovino on a transfer. He quickly earned the golden boot scoring title in 2007, finishing third overall in Serie D, where he netted 24 goals during the run of play, until the summer of 2009, when he signed a one-year deal with FC Crotone. He was then was put on loan to Bellaria in C2 where he netted 10 goals in 30 games, before returning to re-sign a three-year deal with FC Crotone.

In June 2009, Uccello began to be noticed by Canadian fans when he played the first half and scored a goal at BMO Field in a Zinedine Zidane charity game, called "Zidane & Friends All Star Match,"  in which world soccer veterans took on the Canadian All-Stars. The game finished in a 3–3 draw, with Uccello having scored the opening goal for the Canadian All-Stars with a memorable celebration in front of the South Stand in front of his grandfather Paolo Uccello.

He finally debuted for Crotone on September 4, 2010 in a 1–1 away draw versus former Serie A team Torino. In January 2011, Uccello was loaned to A.S. Casale Calcio, with whom he had spent the 2008–09 season. In an interview he said "Both Crotone and Casale have agreed and have assured me that I'm there for one role only and that is to be their first line striker for the next six months." Uccello made his return appearance for Casale on January 15, 2011 in a 5–0 loss to Pro Patria and was elected as the Captain of Casale for the balance of the year.  He returned to Crotone after his loan from Casale and remained until January 2012, when he negotiated a release from the team with a year and a half remaining on his contract.

Uccello has been the top goal scorer for five of the seven teams he has played for in Italy. Uccello, with 128 goals in Italy, has a scoring average of one goal every 59 minutes played (total 19,490 minutes), up to the end of his 2012 season. In 2012, he returned to Canada to play with the York Region Shooters in the   Canadian Soccer League. In 2014, he played in League1 Ontario with Woodbridge Strikers.

International
Uccello first represented Canada with the under-20 team at the 2005 CONCACAF U-20 Tournament, in which Canada won Group B, going undefeated winning all three games. Julian was not a part of the Canadian national team plans until early In October, 2010, senior national team coach Stephen Hart named him in the 18 man Canada squad to play a friendly on October 8 versus Ukraine. He failed to make an appearance in the 2–2 away draw versus Ukraine, with goals for Canada from Atiba Hutchinson and Simeon Jackson.

Personal life
Julian has two younger brothers who are twins, Luca and Michael Uccello. Luca is currently with Toronto FC II and the Canadian National Team. Michael, is now attending the Toronto film school to follow his dream of becoming a film Director/Producer. He also has an older sister Melissa. Julian was diagnosed with Multiple Sclerosis in 2011 which caused him to retire from professional soccer. He is now a V.P. of Housing for Stateview Homes and is currently coaching U-15 Woodbridge Strikers.

References

1986 births
Living people
Canadian soccer players
Canadian expatriate soccer players
Serie B players
Savona F.B.C. players
F.C. Crotone players
York Region Shooters players
Soccer players from Toronto
Canadian Soccer League (1998–present) players
Canadian people of Italian descent
Association football forwards
Woodbridge Strikers players